Stanley Paul are a firm of publishers founded in London in 1906.

The original firm published mainly "cheap editions of thrillers and romances, and some light non-fiction" and traded until 1927 when it went in liquidation. In 1928 the imprint was resurrected as a subsidiary of Hutchinson and Company, when it became known as publishers of sports books.

The firm became part of London Weekend Television in 1979, Century Hutchinson from 1985, and Random Century from 1989.

Book series
 The A.B.C. Series
 The Arsenal Football Books
 The Chelsea Football Books
 Christy Juvenile Fiction Series
 Cole's Fun Doctor
 Companion Series
 The Craftman's Art
 The Essex Library
 The Everyday Series
 The Fantômas Detective Novels
 Go and Play
 Hobbies for All
 The International Library
 Joy of Life Novels
 The Knorr Family of Apron-Pocket Books
 Lotus Library
 New Believe It or Not!
 The New Novel Library
 Playing for Celtic
 Practical Hints Series
 The Rogue's Library
 Sell at Sight Novels
 Stanley Paul's Empire Library
 Stanley Paul's New Series of Readable Fiction
 Stanley Paul's Shilling Series
 Stanley Paul's 3/6 Net Novels
 The Tackle Series
 Tackle Sport This Way
 Taurus Library of Sport
 The Tottenham Hotspur Football Books
 Treasure Library
 The Vade-Mecum Series
 The Wisden Papers
 Wonderful Rewards
 Worldbeaters

References

Publishing companies based in London
Publishing companies established in 1906
1906 establishments in England